HMS Merope was a Crocus-class brig-sloop of the Royal Navy, launched in 1808. She served during the Napoleonic Wars and had a relatively uneventful career that ended with her being sold for breaking up in 1815.

Career
Merope was one of ten Crocus-class brig-sloops  designed by the British navy for patrol and protection duties. They carried approximately 86 men, and were rated for fourteen cannons. Meropes keel was laid at Admiralty's Chatham Dockyard in November 1807. She was launched in July 1808 as the third of her class. Commander Michael Dod commissioned her in July 1808.

Merope was recommissioned in 1810 under Commander John Houston, for the Leeward Islands station of the British fleet.  In 1811 she was under the command of Commander Edward Flin, who sailed her for the Mediterranean on 5 March 1812.

Action at Tarragona
In January 1812 Merope was part of a squadron under Captain Edward Codrington in  operating along the north-east coast of Spain in support of Spanish forces during and after the siege of Tarragona (1811). They harassed the French with cannon fire and transported large numbers of reinforcements into the city by sea. Around 20 January during a battle for Villa Suca, French dragoons captured Flin, Commander James Pringle of Sparrowhawk, and Lieutenant Cattle of Blake while they were on the beach near Salon. The British officers escaped during the d'Eroles assault on Tarragona. Blake came into Villa Nueva on 25 June and joined Merope in firing on French troops on the road to the west. The British vessels succeeded in disabling three wagons, forcing the French to abandon them.

The next day the three vessels observed a French force advancing on Mataró and fired on it near San Juan de Vilasar. The British were not able to prevent the French from entering Mataró and partially occupied it. The French withdrew at daybreak on the following morning, escaping through some vineyards that were out of range of the British vessels and made their way to Arens de Mar (Arenys de Mar).

Action off the Peninsula
In July 1812 Commander John Charles Gawen Roberts recommissioned Merope for patrolling the Spanish coast. Merope left Portsmouth on 23 July. She then served on Spain's east coast under the orders of Rear-admiral Hallowell supporting the army in Catalonia.

On 13 October 1812 she captured the San Antonio. Merope was one of seven British warships present at the Spanish capture of Tarragona on 19 August 1813.

Lieutenant William Benjamin Suckling, who received his promotion to Commander on 1 July 1814, recommissioned Merope for the Mediterranean.

She sailed to North America in 1815. On her return, in July the Admiralty placed her in ordinary.

Fate
The Navy offered Merope for sale at Portsmouth on 23 March. She sold on 23 November for £930 for breaking up.

Notes

Citations

References
 

1808 ships
Brig-sloops of the Royal Navy
Ships built in Chatham